Playin' with Myself is a solo album by saxophonist/pianist Eddie Harris recorded in 1979 and released on the RCA label.

Reception

Richard S. Ginell of AllMusic said "On his second and last RCA LP, Harris strips everything down to just tenor sax and acoustic grand piano -- with himself overdubbing on both -- in an austere, uncompromising series of sessions in several studios. A bold move, particularly for RCA (which probably didn't give a damn anymore), one that few players would dare attempt and fewer could pull off. For Harris, this is only a partial success; some tracks are wandering and anarchic, others are quite musical and one in particular, the title track, actually swings quite well without a rhythm section".

Track listing
All compositions by Eddie Harris
 "Playin' with Myself" – 4:40
 "Freedom Jazz Dance" – 3:53
 "Vextious Progressions" – 4:35
 "There Is No Time" – 4:46
 "Trane's In" – 6:55
 "Plain Old Rhythm" – 5:45
 "What" – 10:20
 "Intransit" – 7:53
 "I Heard That" – 1:41

Personnel
Eddie Harris – tenor saxophone, piano

References

Eddie Harris albums
1979 albums
RCA Records albums